In mathematics, especially operator theory, a hyponormal operator is a generalization of a normal operator. In general, a bounded linear operator T on a complex Hilbert space H is said to be p-hyponormal if:

(That is to say,  is a positive operator.) If , then T is called a hyponormal operator. If , then T is called a semi-hyponormal operator. Moreover, T is said to be log-hyponormal if it is invertible and

An invertible p-hyponormal operator is log-hyponormal. On the other hand, not every log-hyponormal is p-hyponormal.

The class of semi-hyponormal operators was introduced by Xia, and the class of p-hyponormal operators was studied by Aluthge, who used what is today called the Aluthge transformation.

Every subnormal operator (in particular, a normal operator) is hyponormal, and every hyponormal operator is a paranormal convexoid operator. Not every paranormal operator is, however, hyponormal.

See also 
Putnam’s inequality

References 
 

Operator theory
Linear operators